Major General Paul Lombard  was an artillery officer who completed the British Army Staff Course during 1967. He qualified as an Army Air Observation Pilot at the Central Flying School SAAF in Dunnottar. He served as the Chief of Army Staff Planning (GS6) in the South African Defence Force from 1991.

Military career
He served as pilot at 42 Squadron SAAF, Gunnery Instructor at the School of Artillery and Armour. Maj Lombard was appointed as the Chief Instructor Gunnery and later Officer Commanding School of Artillery from 1976 to 1980 as a brigadier, he did a stint as the Officer Commanding Southern Cape Command at George during the 1980s. He was appointed as General of the Artillery from 1991 to 1993.

Awards and decorations

References

|-

|-

Possibly living people
Year of birth missing
South African Army generals
Military attachés
Afrikaner people
South African people of Dutch descent
South African military personnel of the Border War